Walter Pearson may refer to:
 Puggy Pearson (Walter Clyde Pearson), American professional poker player
 Walter Beverly Pearson, American inventor and industrialist